The 2014–15 season was the 100th season of the Isthmian League, which is an English football competition featuring semi-professional and amateur clubs from London, East and South East England.

Following the resignation of Vauxhall Motors from the Conference North, and the liquidation of Southern League Premier Division club Hinckley United, Redhill and Wroxham were reprieved from relegation in Division One South and Division One North respectively.

There was subsequently a further reprieve as Worksop Town resigned from the Northern Premier League. Wingate & Finchley had initially been relegated to Isthmian League Division One North, but were readmitted to the Premier Division. Knock-on effects included Ware moving back to Division One North after first being placed in the Southern League, and Hayes & Yeading United moving to the Southern Premier after initially being placed in the Isthmian Premier.

Premier Division

The Premier Division consisted of 24 clubs: 19 clubs from the previous season, and five new clubs:
 Leatherhead, promoted as play-off winners in Division One South
 Peacehaven & Telscombe, promoted as champions of Division One South
 Tonbridge Angels, relegated from the Conference South
 VCD Athletic, promoted as champions of Division One North
 Witham Town, promoted as play-off winners in Division One North

Maidstone United won the division and were promoted to the Conference South, renamed the National League South for 2015–16. It would be the highest level Maidstone had reached since the club was reformed in 1992. Enfield Town initially finished the season in fifth place, but prior to the play-offs they were controversially deducted three points due to fielding an ineligible player, and dropped out of play-off zone. Margate won the play-offs and returned to the sixth tier after ten seasons in the Isthmian League. The four clubs that finished in the bottom four places were relegated. Peacehaven & Telscombe missed out on a reprieve by one point from Marine who finished 21st in the Northern Premier League.

League table

Top scorers

Play-offs
After Enfield Town were found guilty of fielding an ineligible player in two matches, they were deducted three points, resulting in Metropolitan Police moving into a play-off position. Both play-off semi-finals were postponed until Enfield Town's appeal was (unsuccessfully) concluded.

Semifinals

Final

Results

Stadia and locations

Division One North

Division One North consisted of 24 clubs: 20 clubs from the previous season, and four new clubs:
Brightlingsea Regent, promoted as runners-up in the Eastern Counties League
Cray Wanderers, relegated from the Premier Division
Great Wakering Rovers, promoted as champions of the Essex Senior League
Thamesmead Town, relegated from the Premier Division

Needham Market won the division and were promoted to the Premier Division after three play-off defeats in the four previous seasons. This was the highest level so far reached by the club in its history. Brentwood Town won the play-offs and joined Needham Market in the Premier Division after eight years in Division One North. Burnham Ramblers finished bottom of the table and were the only relegated club after Barkingside and Redbridge were reprieved. This was due to Salisbury City not starting the season, Hereford United folding during the season and the lack of clubs promoting from the ninth tier.

League table

Top scorers

Play-offs

Semifinals

Final

Results

Stadia and locations

Division One South

Division One South consisted of 24 clubs: 20 clubs from the previous season, and four new clubs:
Carshalton Athletic, relegated from the Premier Division
East Grinstead Town, promoted as runners-up in the Sussex County League
South Park, promoted as champions of the Combined Counties League
Whyteleafe, promoted as champions of the Southern Counties East League

Burgess Hill Town won the division achieving the longest unbeaten run in this season's levels 1-8 of 36 matches. They were promoted to the Premier Division along with play-off winners Merstham. Horsham and Redhill were relegated, while East Grinstead Town were given a reprieve due to Salisbury City failing to start the season, Hereford United folding during the season and the lack of clubs promoting from the ninth tier. Horsham lost their place in the Isthmian League after 32 seasons.

League table

Top scorers

Play-offs

Semifinals

Final

Results

Stadia and locations

League Cup

The Isthmian League Cup 2014–15 (billed as the Robert Dyas Cup 2014–15 for sponsorship reasons) is the 41st season of the Isthmian League Cup, the cup competition of the whole Isthmian League.

Calendar

The Isthmian League Cup was voluntary this season, eight clubs decided not to take part in the competition:
Bognor Regis Town
Canvey Island
Dereham Town
Guernsey
Hastings United
Soham Town Rangers
VCD Athletic
Wroxham

First round
All sixty-four clubs participated in the League Cup from the First round.

Second round

Third round

Quarterfinals

Semifinals

Final

See also
Isthmian League
2014–15 Northern Premier League
2014–15 Southern League

References

External links
Official website

2014-15
7